GTS/BKN are Australian regional television stations serving the Spencer Gulf of South Australia and the Broken Hill area of New South Wales. Based in Port Pirie with satellite offices in Broken Hill, Port Augusta, Whyalla and Port Lincoln, and studio and playout facilities based in Hobart, the station's name originates from the Port Pirie and Broken Hill stations' callsigns, GTS Port Pirie and BKN Broken Hill.

History
GTS signed on for the first time on 1 March 1968. BKN followed soon afterward, on 16 August. In 1974, the stations (and their repeaters) merged to form Spencer Gulf Telecasters and broadcast under the name GTS/BKN Television. The company was bought by Southern Cross Broadcasting (SCB) in 2001, though it retained the Central name until the end of 2005.

Due to their areas' sparse populations, after aggregation they remained among the few stations in Australia that continued to cherry-pick programming from all three networks, though from 2001 onward it began favouring Seven through its affiliation with Southern Cross Television. In 2003, Spencer Gulf Telecasters won the right to broadcast a second station in the same area, and in January 2004 started broadcasting SGS/SCN as a Ten affiliate. Since 31 October 2010, GTS/BKN has also operated a third station relaying Nine Network programs from Sydney and Adelaide (callsign GDS in Port Pirie and BDN in Broken Hill).

In January 2006, Central GTS/BKN was renamed Southern Cross GTS/BKN, changing its logo to the star logo used by TNT Tasmania and TND Darwin.

In July 2018, Southern Cross GTS/BKN was renamed Seven GTS/BKN, changing its logo to the Seven logo as currently used by the other SCTV stations.

Digital channels
On 31 October 2010, GTS/BKN launched GDS/BDN, a Channel Nine affiliate rebroadcasting TCN Sydney. On 11 January 2011, GTS/BKN launched Ten's SD multichannel Eleven. Starting from 7 November 2011, GTS/BKN slowly rolled out 9Gem, 9Go!, 7two, 7mate and One as digital channels across the GTS/BKN areas.

On 7 December 2013, GDS/BDN switched to a feed of NWS Adelaide. On 30 September 2018, GDS/BDN launched 9Life.

Programming
The main GTS/BKN service carries programming from the Seven Network, including the Adelaide edition of Seven News' nightly 6pm bulletin. GDS/BDN broadcasts programs from the Nine Network and the state bulletin from NWS from Adelaide.

GTS/BKN during the late 1970s & mid 1980s produced their own local commercials and TV shows like Panel Probe, Woman's World, Cue and local documentaries.

News
GTS/BKN produces a half-hour regional news program titled Nightly News (formerly Southern Cross News until 14 December 2018), airing at 6:30pm on weeknights, following Seven News Adelaide. The bulletin is presented from Southern Cross Austereo's studio in Hobart, with reporters and video journalists based at news bureaus in Port Pirie, Broken Hill, Port Augusta, Port Lincoln and Whyalla. Since 2019, it is presented by Madeline Kerr or John Hunt, with Alex Sykes presenting the weather. The bulletin adopted the current title on 14 January 2019.

The day's bulletin is later uploaded by the station's YouTube channel.

Previous presenters of the program during its tenure as Southern Cross News include Virginia Langeberg, Tim Hatfield, Fraser Goldsworthy and Julie Snook, while Will McDonald, Nicole Haack and Rosanna Mangiarelli presented under the Central News title.

The current team of Nightly News video journalists consists of: Annabel Francis (Port Pirie), Daniel Pizarro (Port Augusta), Edward McCarroll (Whyalla), Ally Hall (Port Lincoln) and Josh Mercer (Broken Hill).

In 2019, Southern Cross Austereo shifted the bulletin to 7two at 7:00 pm rather than airing on the main channel.

Channels

The following is a list of channels broadcast on GTS and BKN respectively.

GTS/BKN:

GDS/BDN:

References

External links
Official site

Southern Cross Media Group
Television channels and stations established in 1968
1968 establishments in Australia